This is a list of museums in San Marino.

National museum

Other museums

 Museo delle Cere
 Sammarinese Museum of Ancient Arms
 Torture Museum
 Museo storico della federazione balestrieri sammarinesi
 Museo della civiltà contadina e delle tradizioni della Repubblica di San Marino
 Museo delle curiosità
 Reptilarium-aquarium di San Marino
 Le macchine di Leonardo da Vinci

 
San Marino
San Marino
Museums